The discography of Phil Ochs, a U.S. protest singer and songwriter, consists of seven studio albums, six live albums, six compilation albums, one box set, six other albums, and nine singles.

Ochs released eight albums under his own name during his lifetime. Since his suicide in 1976, fifteen additional albums have been released, including six compilations and one box set.

Ochs's albums received critical attention but little commercial success. His best-selling album was Pleasures of the Harbor.

Albums

Studio albums

Live albums

IGunfight at Carnegie Hall was released only in Canada.

Compilation albums

IIAmerican Troubadour was released only in the U.K.

Other albums

IIICamp Favorites was released by "The Campers", who consist of Phil Ochs (who is not credited on the record), an unknown female vocalist, and a group of young singers, accompanied by Dick Weissman on banjo.
IVSings for Broadside consists of demo recordings and live recordings.
VInterviews with Phil Ochs consists of an interview with Phil Ochs.
VIThe Broadside Tapes 1 consists of demo recordings and a live recording.
VIIThe Early Years consists of studio recordings and live recordings.
VIIIOn My Way consists of demo recordings made for Roy Connors of The Highwaymen in 1963.

Box sets

Singles

VIII"I Ain't Marching Anymore" was released as a single in the U.K. and as a flexi disc in Sing Out! magazine.
IX"Bwatue" was released only in Africa.

B-sides

X"Outside of a Small Circle of Friends" was edited for radio play.
XIThe single version of "The Harder They Fall" has never been included on any album or compilation.

See also
 List of songs recorded by Phil Ochs

Notes

References

External links

Discography
Folk music discographies
Discographies of American artists